Henry Caldera (born 27 March 1959) is a Curaçao professional football manager. In 2000 and in October 2010 he coached Netherlands Antilles national football team. Since 2012 until 2013 he trained the Curaçao national under-17 football team. He is also led the Curaçao national under-20 football team from July to October 2012. Currently he working as a manager of the Curaçao national under-20 football team

References

External links
 Profile at Soccerway.com

1959 births
Living people
Curaçao football managers
Dutch Antillean football managers
Netherlands Antilles national football team managers